Whispering Winds is a 1929 American pre-Code drama film directed by James Flood and starring Patsy Ruth Miller, Malcolm McGregor and Eve Southern.

Cast
 Patsy Ruth Miller as Dora 
 Malcolm McGregor as Jim 
 Eve Southern as Eve Benton 
 Eugenie Besserer as Jim's Mother 
 James A. Marcus as Pappy 
 Claire McDowell as Mrs. Benton

References

Bibliography
 Pitts, Michael R. Poverty Row Studios, 1929–1940: An Illustrated History of 55 Independent Film Companies, with a Filmography for Each. McFarland & Company, 2005.

External links
 

1929 films
1929 drama films
1920s English-language films
Films directed by James Flood
Tiffany Pictures films
American black-and-white films
1920s American films